Carl Edward Vuono (born October 18, 1934) is a retired United States Army general who served as the Chief of Staff of the United States Army from 1987 to 1991.

Early life and career

Vuono was born on October 18, 1934 in Monongahela, Pennsylvania. He is of Finnish and Italian ancestry. He began his career as a field artillery officer after graduating from the United States Military Academy, in West Point, New York. After graduating with the class of 1957, he served three tours in South Vietnam as an artillery battalion executive officer with the 1st Infantry Division in 1966–67; executive officer of Division Artillery, 1st Cavalry Division (Airmobile) in 1970; and as commander, 1st Battalion, 77th Field Artillery Regiment in 1970–1971, and then as commanding officer (Colonel) of Division Artillery, 82d Airborne Division. Vuono rose through the ranks quickly, serving several times in the United States Army Training and Doctrine Command, in which he eventually became its commander in 1986.

Post-army career and later life
After his retirement from the army, Vuono joined Military Professional Resources Inc. (MPRI), a private military company, in 1993. Since 1999 he has served as the CEO of MPRI. L-3 Communications acquired MPRI in June 2000 at which point Vuono was offered a senior management position at L-3 Communications.

In 2003, Vuono was awarded the Distinguished Graduate Award by the West Point Association of Graduates. He holds an Honorary Doctorate in Public Administration from Shippensburg University.

Awards and decorations

References

External links

U.S. Army biography

Atlantic Council
1934 births
Living people
People from Monongahela, Pennsylvania
Military personnel from Pennsylvania
American people of Finnish descent
American people of Italian descent
United States Army Chiefs of Staff
United States Military Academy alumni
United States Army War College alumni
United States Army personnel of the Vietnam War
Recipients of the Distinguished Service Medal (US Army)
Recipients of the Legion of Merit
Commandants of the United States Army Command and General Staff College
Recipients of the Defense Distinguished Service Medal
Recipients of the Navy Distinguished Service Medal
Recipients of the Air Force Distinguished Service Medal
Recipients of the Coast Guard Distinguished Service Medal